The Alcobaça Formation, previously known as the Guimarota Formation and also known as the Consolação Unit, is a geological formation in Portugal. It dates back to the Kimmeridgian stage of the Late Jurassic. It is an important source of information on the diversity of Late Jurassic mammals. Many of the fossils were collected from the now disused and flooded Camadas de Guimarota coal mine.

Vertebrate paleofauna 
Dinosaur eggs are geographically located in Lisbon District, Portugal. Dinosaur tracks are geographically located in Leiria District, Portugal.

Amphibians

Ornithischians 
Indeterminate euornithopod remains located in Lisbon District. Indeterminate stegosaurid remains present in Lisbon District.

Saurischians 
Indeterminate sauropod remains located in Leiria and Lisboa.

Turtles

Lepidosauromorphs

Crocodyliformes

Mammals

See also 
 List of dinosaur-bearing rock formations
 List of fossiliferous stratigraphic units in Portugal

References

Bibliography 
  

Geologic formations of Portugal
Jurassic System of Europe
Jurassic Portugal
Kimmeridgian Stage
Marl formations
Coal formations
Coal in Portugal
Lagoonal deposits
Reef deposits
Ichnofossiliferous formations
Ooliferous formations
Fossiliferous stratigraphic units of Europe
Paleontology in Portugal